Flåvær fyr is a coastal lighthouse on the island of Vardholmen in the Flåvær islands in the Herøyfjord in the municipality of Herøy on west coast of Norway.  The lighthouse is located southwest of Fosnavåg and Eggesbønes and north of the island of Gurskøya.

In 1952 it was connected to the electrical power grid, and it was fully automated in 1979.

See also

 List of lighthouses in Norway
 Lighthouses in Norway

References

External links
 North Sea Trail entry
 Leuchtturmseiten on lighthouse
 Norsk Fyrhistorisk Forening 

Lighthouses completed in 1870
Lighthouses in Møre og Romsdal
Sunnmøre